The Gold Country Museum is a history museum located in Auburn, California, United States. It focuses on the history of the California Gold Rush in Placer County.

History
The museum is located in a building that was built in 1855, as the first Placer County hospital.

Exhibitions

The museums exhibitions examine the California Gold Rush in the region. Exhibitions include a replica of a mining tunnel and an assayer's office, both which visitors walk through. There are also dioramas of a miner's cabin, a stamp mill, and a mining camp saloon. There are also exhibitions about gold mining techniques and the transportation aspects of getting to California during the rush. Visitors can also pan for gold, play a game of faro, and watch a video about the history of the gold rush. The Museum also includes a large collection of medical implements.

References

External links
Official website

Mining museums in California
Museums in Placer County, California
Auburn, California
California Gold Rush
History museums in California
Gold museums